Trigonidium obtusum, the blue-leaved trigonidium, is an orchid found in Brazil that flowers in the summer.

Description

The pseudobulbs of the plant are compressed and oblong, with two lanceolate leaves. The scapes spring from the rhizome, and each scape ends with a single flower. The flower is yellowish to pinkish with purple veins and blue eyespots. Flower development takes ten days, and flowers wither four to ten days after opening. During the hottest hours of the day, the flowers release a sweet fragrance similar to lemon. Pentadecane is the main component of the fragrance.

Ecology

Male Plebeia droryana bees pollinate the flowers by performing pseudocopulation. Bees become trapped in the tubular orchid after being attracted by the sepals or petals of the flower. Two types T. obtusum flowers exist, one with attractive sepals and one with attractive petals. The flowers are morphologically identical besides the sepals and flowers, and most likely discourage self-pollination by hindering the process of bee learning. Pollination of T. obtusum is unique in the fact that pollination does not only require pseudocopulation but also trapping the male bee. Bees carrying pollinarium occasionally revisit the same flower, but self-pollination does not occur. Though pentadecane produces the fragrance of the flower, pentadecane itself does not attract P. droryana bees.

References

Orchids of Brazil
Maxillariinae